Filip Čermelj (born 28 September 1998) is a Serbian professional footballer who plays as a midfielder for Teleoptik.

Club career
Čermelj made his first footballing steps at OFK Beograd. He spent four years in the club's youth setup, before joining Partizan at the age of 10. In June 2015, Čermelj was one of the seven youngsters promoted to the senior squad at the start of preparations for the 2015–16 campaign. He was later sent back to the youth team to finish his formation.

In July 2016, Čermelj was loaned to affiliated side Teleoptik. He signed his first professional contract with Partizan on 31 January 2017, on a three-year deal. Afterwards, Čermelj continued to play regularly for Teleoptik and helped them win the Serbian League Belgrade in the 2016–17 season, thus earning promotion to the Serbian First League.

International career
Čermelj represented Serbia at under-17 level, appearing in four games during the 2015 UEFA European Under-17 Championship qualifying stage.

Personal life
Čermelj was born in Mérida, Spain, as his father, Miroslav, played for Extremadura at the time. His older brother, Luka, is also a footballer.

Honours
Teleoptik
 Serbian League Belgrade: 2016–17

Notes

References

External links
 
 Filip Čermelj at Srbijafudbal
 

Association football midfielders
People from Mérida, Spain
Sportspeople from the Province of Badajoz
Serbia youth international footballers
Serbian footballers
1998 births
Living people
OFK Beograd players
FK Mačva Šabac players
FK Partizan players
FK Teleoptik players
FK Budućnost Dobanovci players
Serbian SuperLiga players
Serbian First League players